Verkhny Ubekimakhi (Dargwa: ЧебяхӀ Убекимахьи) is a rural locality (a selo) and the administrative centre of Verkhne-Ubekimakhinsky Selsoviet, Levashinsky District, Republic of Dagestan, Russia. The population was 842 as of 2010. There are 7 streets.

Geography 
Verkhny Ubekimakhi is located 27 km southwest of Levashi (the district's administrative centre) by road, on the Barchuma River. Guladtymakhi and Ditunshimakhi are the nearest rural localities.

Nationalities 
Dargins live there.

References 

Rural localities in Levashinsky District